Alice Muriel Gaddum (née Behrens; 23 April 1885 – 28 June 1952) was a British advocate of Girl Guiding and is remembered chiefly for her contribution to the training of adults in the movement. She was the first Guider-in-Charge at Foxlease and Head of Training.

She was the daughter of Sir Charles Behrens and Emily, Lady Behrens.

In 1913, Behrens was persuaded by Helen Malcolm to become the Commissioner for the Guides in Manchester and organise them. In October 1916, after the suggestion of Robert Baden-Powell, she organised the Matlock Conference. Commissioners from around Britain met to share ideas and encourage one another.

Beginning in 1926, Behrens visited Australia, New Zealand and South Africa to promote Guiding. Following her death, she was eulogised in The Times by Lady Baden-Powell:

See also

Olave Baden-Powell
Rose Kerr
Olivia Burges

References

Girlguiding officials
1885 births
1952 deaths
People from Altrincham
20th-century British businesspeople